Ubiraci Ferreira dos Santos , commonly known as  Bira , (born 27 April 1969) is a former Brazilian footballer.

Club career
Bira played for América-RJ and Atlético Mineiro in the Campeonato Brasileiro Série A. He played three seasons for Paniliakos in the Greek Super League. He also had a brief spell in Portugal with Alverca.

References

1969 births
Living people
Brazilian footballers
America Football Club (RJ) players
Clube Atlético Mineiro players
S.C. Beira-Mar players
F.C. Alverca players
Paniliakos F.C. players

Association football forwards
Sportspeople from Rio de Janeiro (state)
People from São João de Meriti